Natalie Giselle Juncos (born 28 December 1990) is an American-born Argentine footballer who plays as a defender for Racing Club de Avellaneda and the Argentina women's national team.

Early life
Juncos was born in Detroit to Argentine Olympic swimmers Luis Juncos and Valentina Aracil. She was raised in Rochester, Minnesota and lived in Brandon, Mississippi. Juncos attended the University of Florida, where she played for the Florida Gators women's soccer team. In 2010 she opted to transfer to the University of Houston where she appeared in 41 matches and served as the team captain during her senior year.

International career
Juncos made her senior debut for Argentina during the 2018 Copa América Femenina on 6 April that year in a 1–3 loss to Brazil. She represented Argentina at the 2019 FIFA Women's World Cup in France. The same year, Juncos participated at the 2019 Pan American Games where she won a silver medal as part of the Argentina national team.

Personal life
Juncos is married to an American man from Texas. Her brother Nicholas is also an association football player. Her parents now live in Little Rock, Arkansas.

References

External links

1990 births
Living people
Women's association football defenders
Women's association football midfielders
Argentine women's footballers
Argentina women's international footballers
2019 FIFA Women's World Cup players
Pan American Games silver medalists for Argentina
Pan American Games medalists in football
Footballers at the 2019 Pan American Games
Club Atlético River Plate (women) players
UAI Urquiza (women) players
American women's soccer players
Soccer players from Detroit
Soccer players from Mississippi
People from Brandon, Mississippi
American people of Argentine descent
Florida Gators women's soccer players
Houston Cougars women's soccer players
Medalists at the 2019 Pan American Games